Yr Arddu is a mountain summit found in the Moelwynion in Snowdonia; grid reference SH673507.

The height of the summit above sea level is 589 meters (1932 ft). The height was measured and confirmed on March 10, 2007.

This summit should not be confused with Yr Arddu (South).

References

External links
 Welsh Mountaineering Club
 Location on Streetmap

Mountains and hills of Snowdonia
Mountains and hills of Conwy County Borough